Darūnṭa (or Khayrow Khel), also spelled Daruntah or Derunta, is a village in Jalalabad District of Nangarhar province. It is located next to Jalalabad city on route AO1 in Afghanistan.

Numerous remains of stupas from the 1st century BCE- 1st century CE, can be found around Darunta, such as in Bimaran.

It gave its name to the Darunta training camp located north of the village, across the Darunta Dam.

Gallery

See also 
Nangarhar Province

References

Populated places in Nangarhar Province